Fra Cristoblal Mountain is the highest summit of the Fra Cristobal Range in Sierra County, New Mexico. It is the peak in the northern end of the range, which gives the range its name. The summit overlooks the Jornada del Muerto to the east.

History 
Fra Cristoblal Mountain is said to have resembled the profile of a priest, Fray Cristóbal de Salazar, a cousin of Juan de Oñate, with the first colonizing expedition in 1598.  The mountain marked the turn westward Jornada del Muerto toward the west where the trail passed through the Lava Gate to reach the Rio Grande.

References

External links
Range Highpoint
Fra Cristobal Mountain, mountainzone, (coordinates), (elev: 5955)

Mountains of Sierra County, New Mexico
Mountains of New Mexico